William Churchill (6 October 1840 – 20 October 1907) was an English first-class cricketer and barrister.

The son of William Churchill senior, he was born in October 1840 at Winterborne Stickland, Dorset. He was educated at Brighton College, before going up to Trinity College, Cambridge. He was a member of Cambridge University Cricket Club, but did not feature in first-class cricket for the club. He graduated from Cambridge in 1864 and trained to become a barrister at Lincoln's Inn, being called to the bar in 1867. A keen amateur cricketer, Churchill made two appearances in first-class cricket for the Marylebone Cricket Club against Oxford University at Oxford in 1870, and Cambridge University at Fenner's in 1872. He scored 16 runs across his two appearances, with a highest score of 12. Churchill died at Woking in October 1907, unmarried and without issue. In his will he left money to a number of charitable causes, including the Dorset County Hospital and the Royal National Lifeboat Institution.

References

External links

1840 births
1907 deaths
Cricketers from Dorset
People educated at Brighton College
Alumni of Trinity College, Cambridge
Members of Lincoln's Inn
English barristers
English cricketers
Marylebone Cricket Club cricketers